Bolas or bolases (singular bola; from Spanish and Portuguese bola, "ball", also known as a boleadora or boleadeira) is a type of throwing weapon made of weights on the ends of interconnected cords, used to capture animals by entangling their legs. Bolas were most famously used by the gauchos, but have been found in excavations of Pre-Columbian settlements, especially in Patagonia, where indigenous peoples (particularly the Tehuelche) used them to catch 200-pound guanacos and rheas. The Mapuche and the Inca army used them in battle.  Mapuche warriors used bolas in their confrontations with the Chilean Army during the Occupation of Araucanía (1861–1883).

Use 

Gauchos used boleadoras to capture running cattle or game. Depending on the exact design, the thrower grasps the boleadora by one of the weights or by the nexus of the cords. The thrower gives the balls momentum by swinging them and then releases the boleadora. The weapon is usually used to entangle the animal's legs, but when thrown with enough force might even inflict damage (e.g. breaking a bone).

Traditionally, Inuit have used bolas to hunt birds, fouling the birds in air with the lines of the bola. People of a Feather showed Belcher Island Inuit using bolas to hunt eider ducks on the wing.

Design 

There is no uniform design; most bolas have two or three balls, but there are versions of up to eight or nine. Some bolas have balls of equal weight, others vary the knot and cord. Gauchos use bolas made of braided leather cords with wooden balls or small leather sacks full of stones at the ends of the cords.

Bolas can be named depending on the number of weights used:

 Perdida (one weight)
 Avestrucera or ñanducera (two weights, for rheas)
 Somai (two weights)
 Achico (three weights)
 Boleadora (three weights)
 Kiipooyaq (Inuit name for bolas with three or more weights)

Bolas of three weights are usually designed with two shorter cords with heavier weights, and one longer cord with a light weight. The heavier weights fly at the front parallel to each other, hit either side of the legs, and the lighter weight goes around, wrapping up the legs.

Other unrelated versions include qilumitautit, the bolas of the Inuit, made of sinew and bone weights and used to capture water birds.

See also 
 Bolas spiders, which swing a sticky web blob at the end of a web line to capture prey
 Bolo tie, a style of necktie resembling the bolas at the end of a string
 Eskimo yo-yo, a skill toy resembling fur-covered bolas or yo-yos
 Lasso or lariat, a looped rope used for similar purposes, especially in North America
 Meteor hammer and meteor, a Chinese melee weapon and a Chinese skill toy, both consisting of two weights connected by a rope or chain
 Poi, a Māori skill toy consisting of a ball attached to a tasseled cord
 Astrorope, a prototype of Crew Self Rescue (CSR) device for extravehicular activity (EVA) in space flight – see Astronaut propulsion unit

References

External links 

 Boleadoras

Ancient weapons
Argentine folklore
Throwing weapons
Chain and rope throwing weapons
Chilean folklore
Culture in Rio Grande do Sul
Indigenous culture of the Southern Cone
Indigenous weapons of the Americas
Lithics
Uruguayan folklore
Hunting equipment
Gaucho culture
Primitive weapons